Narciso García-Loygorri y Rizo, 2nd Duke of Vistahermosa (5 December 183729 October 1905) was a mayor of Madrid for 50 days between 19 August until 8 October 1890. He Served as ambassador in Russia, and also in Helvetia. Senator between 1889 and 1890. By this time, being a Grandee (Grande de España) also implied to be a Senator. He received the Royal and Distinguished Order of Charles III.

1837 births
1905 deaths
People from Madrid
Mayors of Madrid
Members of the Senate of Spain
Ambassadors of Spain to Russia